The 1963 World Sportscar Championship season was the 11th season of FIA World Sportscar Championship motor racing. It featured the 1963 International Championship for GT Manufacturers, which was contested in three engine capacity divisions and the 1963 International Trophy for GT Prototypes, which was contested in two engine capacity divisions. The season ran from 17 February 1963 to 14 September 1963 over 22 events.

This was the first World Sportscar Championship season to include hillclimb and rally events.

Schedule
Each of the following 22 events counted towards one or more of the FIA titles. All divisions did not compete in all events and some events were open to classes which were not contesting a championship or trophy round.

Results – International Championship for GT Manufacturers

Results – International Trophy for GT Prototypes

References

External links
 1963 World Sportscar Championship – Race results

World Sportscar Championship seasons
World